Yary is a surname. Notable people with the surname include: 

Richard Yary (1898–1969), Ukrainian nationalist journalist, politician, and military figure
Ron Yary (born 1946), American football player

See also
Hary (name)
Lary
Yardy